Seccions Deportives Espanyol is a multisport club based in Barcelona, Spain. It was founded in 2017 by supporters of football club RCD Espanyol.

History
During several years, football club RCD Espanyol had sections of different sports, being specially notable the sections of rink rockey, 11 times winner of the Copa del Rey, basketball, one-time winner of the Copa del Rey and played ten times in the top-tier, and women's volleyball, three times league champions and five times cup champions. Sections were being disbanded during years and finally Espanyol dedicated only to football.

In March 2017, the Association of Supporters and Shareholders of RCD Espanyol boosted a project for recovering the sporting sections of the club, but this time without any economic link with the football team. The new multisports club was created with the name of Seccions Deportives Espanyol (Sporting sections Espanyol).

Two months later, the Association confirmed that Espanyol would start competing with a rink hockey team in the 2017–18 fifth tier. The club also would launch a women's volleyball team.

For its second season, after the promotion of the rink hockey club to the fourth tier, the club would expand its sections to handball and basketball.

Basketball

Season by season

Roller hockey

Season by season

References

External links
Official website

RCD Espanyol
Catalan rink hockey clubs
Catalan basketball teams
Catalan volleyball clubs
Spanish handball clubs
Multi-sport clubs in Spain
2017 establishments in Spain